Lophocorona robinsoni is a moth of the family Lophocoronidae. It was described by Nielsen and Kristensen in 1996, and is only known from New South Wales.

References

Moths described in 1996
Moths of Australia
Fauna of New South Wales
Endemic fauna of Australia
Lophocoronoidea
Taxa named by Ebbe Nielsen